WWIII Music was a record label created by American Music Corp in 2001 for death metal albums. AMC titles were distributed by the Innovative Distribution Network collection of labels controlled by Alliance Entertainment.

WWIII launched in 2001 with an ambitious plan of 30 albums in a year. It distributed albums by bands such as Prototype. They have also released sampler albums such as:  World War III Sampler 2001 which includes songs by bands like Hate, Imagika, Prototype and others.

References

Heavy metal record labels